Mixed Doubles may refer to:

Entertainment
 Mixed Doubles (play), a 1969 British play
 "Mixed Doubles" (Frasier), an episode of the American television comedy series Frasier
 "Mixed Doubles" (The Professionals), an episode of the British crime-action television drama series
 Mixed Doubles (1933 film), a British comedy film
 Mixed Doubles (2006 film), an Indian film directed by Rajat Kapoor
 Mixed Doubles (2017 film), a Japanese film

See also
 Mixed doubles sports